is a private junior college in Kyoto, Japan, established in 1952.

Alumni
Manami Honjo, actress

External links
 Official website 

Japanese junior colleges
Educational institutions established in 1952
Private universities and colleges in Japan
Universities and colleges in Kyoto Prefecture
1952 establishments in Japan